The 2005–06 Edmonton Oilers season was the Oilers' 27th season in the NHL, and they were coming off a 36–29–12–5 record with 89 points and finishing 9th in the Western Conference in 2003–04 and missed the playoffs. In 2005–06, the Oilers qualified for the playoffs in eighth place, and put on a playoff run that brought them to the Stanley Cup Final finishing with a loss in Game 7 to the victorious Carolina Hurricanes by a score of 3–1.
This was the first time an eighth seeded team reached the Stanley Cup finals (which was repeated in 2012 and 2017).

Offseason
Due to the 2004–05 NHL lockout, the 2004–05 NHL season was cancelled when the players and owners could not agree to a new CBA.  The two sides would come to agreement, and there would be many changes for both the Oilers and the NHL as a whole.

The NHL introduced a salary cap of $39 million for the 2005–06, which meant the teams above that figure would cut salary to fit under the cap.  The Oilers, who had a lot of cap room, took advantage of this, and the St. Louis Blues would trade former Hart- and Norris Trophy-winning Chris Pronger to the Oilers in exchange for Eric Brewer, Jeff Woywitka and Doug Lynch. Pronger would then sign a five-year, $31.25 million contract with Edmonton. The Oilers would then make another blockbuster trade, this time acquiring former Frank J. Selke Trophy winner Michael Peca from the New York Islanders for Mike York and a fourth-round draft pick.

The NHL also made a number of rule changes, such as adding a shootout to determine the winner of a game that was tied after five minutes of overtime to eliminate ties, goaltenders were not allowed to play the puck in the corners of the ice surface and the referees would crack down on obstruction.

Regular season
The Oilers would start off the season rather slowly, sitting with a 9–9–1 record after 19 games, but the club would get hot, going 21–9–7 in their next 37 games.  As the trade deadline approached, the club did not have a clear number one goaltender, and they addressed this issue by trading their first-round draft pick in 2006 to the Minnesota Wild for Dwayne Roloson. Edmonton would also add former Calder Memorial Trophy winner Sergei Samsonov to the club, sending Marty Reasoner, Yan Stastny and a second-round draft pick (Milan Lucic) to the Boston Bruins to acquire him. The Oilers played mediocre hockey for the rest of the season, but nonetheless managed to finish in eighth place in the Western Conference and qualify for the playoffs for the first time since 2003.

Offensively, Ryan Smyth would lead the club with 36 goals, his highest total since scoring 39 goals in 1996–97, and 22-year-old Ales Hemsky would break-out, earning a club-high 58 assists and 77 points. Shawn Horcoff would also have a breakout season, scoring 22 goals and 73 points, as would Jarret Stoll, who scored 22 goals and earned 68 points. On defence, Chris Pronger would anchor the blueline, earning a defenceman-high 56 points, while Marc-Andre Bergeron would score 15 goals and 35 points from the blueline. Ethan Moreau had a club-high 87 penalty minutes.

In goal, Edmonton would use a trio of goaltenders until the arrival of Dwayne Roloson at the trade deadline. Mike Morrison would win ten games and have a 2.83 goals against average (GAA), but he would not last the season with the Oilers; he was claimed off waivers by the Ottawa Senators. Ty Conklin, the starter from 2003 to 2004, would appear in only 18 games, going 8–5–1 with a 2.80 GAA, before being sent to the minors. Jussi Markkanen won a club-high 15 games, and would serve as Dwayne Roloson's backup when the club acquired him. Roloson would post a team-best 2.43 GAA and have an 8–7–4 record with the team.

The Oilers allowed the fewest shorthanded goals in the NHL, with just five.

Season standings

Playoffs
Edmonton would open up the playoffs against the Presidents' Trophy winners, the Detroit Red Wings, who finished with 124 points during the season. Hockey experts almost unanimously predicted a Detroit victory; however, the Oilers had played the season in a tougher division than the Red Wings, who played 24 of their 82 games against the Columbus Blue Jackets, Chicago Blackhawks and St. Louis Blues, who had finished 25th, 28th and 30th, respectively, in the standings. In Game 1 at Joe Louis Arena, the Oilers played a tight defensive style and took the Wings to double overtime before losing 3–2, despite being outshot 57–25 in the game. The Oilers tied the series with a solid 4–2 win in Game 2 to return home with a split. Game 3 at Rexall Place saw the Oilers squander a late two-goal lead as the Wings forced the game to double overtime, where the Oilers won on a goal by Jarret Stoll. Game 4 saw the Red Wings score three powerplay goals and tie the series with a 4–2 win, and the teams returned to Detroit for Game 5. With the series tied 2–2, the Oilers jumped out to an early 3–0 lead and hung on for a 3–2 win, behind the strong two-way play of defenceman Chris Pronger. The Oilers returned home looking to complete the upset in Game 6, but fell behind the Red Wings 2–0 by the second intermission. Then the Oilers caught fire in the third period, tying the game on two goals from Fernando Pisani. After the Red Wings scored to re-take the lead, the Oilers again tied the game on a crease-crashing goal from Ales Hemsky. In the final minute of play, Hemsky roofed a pass from Sergei Samsonov behind Detroit goaltender Manny Legace, and the Edmonton crowd exploded in jubilation. The Oilers hung on to win the game 4–3, eliminating the heavily favoured Red Wings in six games. It was the Oilers' first playoff series win since eliminating the Colorado Avalanche in 1998.

The opening round of the 2006 NHL playoffs had an unprecedented development in the Western Conference: in each of the four series played, the team with the lower points total had emerged as the victor. As a result, in the Conference Semifinals, the eighth-place Oilers would face the fifth-place San Jose Sharks, who finished the season with only four more points than Edmonton, at 99. Still, the Sharks were considered a tough opponent, having NHL MVP and scoring leader Joe Thornton, along with League goals leader Jonathan Cheechoo among their stars.

Game 1 at the HP Pavilion ended in a 2–1 San Jose victory as the Sharks executed a physical forechecking gameplan and outshot the Oilers 30–16. In Game 2, the Sharks entered the ice to a cheer that eclipsed 109 decibels, and they rode their fans' emotion to another slim 2–1 victory. The Sharks had taken a two-game lead in the series, but were now missing Milan Michalek, one of their best offensive forwards. Michalek had been blasted in open ice by Oilers' forward Raffi Torres in Game 2. When the teams returned to Rexall Place for Game 3, the Edmonton crowd exploded; the noise in the building eclipsed 114 decibels as the Oilers came onto the ice. The Oilers parlayed the noise into inspired play, running roughshod all over the ice and outshooting the Sharks 15–2 by the end of the first period. Sharks goaltender Vesa Toskala held tough, however, and the Oilers only took a 1–0 lead into the first intermission. By the third period, the Sharks had taken a 2–1 lead, and it stood until Torres tied the game with a wrist-shot as he came down the wing. The game went into overtime, and the Sharks nearly ended it on a 2-on-1 rush, as Thornton passed to Cheechoo for the shot, but Dwayne Roloson dove across the crease and sniped the puck out of mid-air. The game finally ended in the third overtime, as the Oilers' top line of Horcoff, Hemsky and Smyth worked a passing play into the San Jose crease, where Horcoff jammed the puck in the San Jose goal for the Edmonton win. In Game 4 in Edmonton, the Oilers were trailing 3–2 in the second period when Sergei Samsonov's penalty expired and he was sent in alone on Toskala. To everyone's shock, Toskala came charging out of the net to get the puck before Samsonov. Toskala lost the puck and Samsonov slid a backhand into the open net to tie the game. The Edmonton crowd exploded in delight, and the Oilers never looked back, cruising to a 6–3 win. Game 5 in San Jose was the site of an unfortunate incident: the American feed of the Game 4 broadcast in Edmonton had picked up background noise during the playing of the American National Anthem. San Jose fans had thought it was booing, and in Game 5, a majority of San Jose fans booed the entire Canadian National Anthem. The game itself saw the Oilers carry over the momentum they gained from Game 4, and they struck for three powerplay goals and one shorthanded goal en route to another 6–3 win. In Game 6 in Edmonton, the Edmonton crowd loudly cheered the singing of the American anthem, and then joined anthem singer Paul Lorieau in a throaty and passionate rendition of "O Canada." The Oilers picked up where they had left off in the previous game – they stymied the Sharks' high-scoring forwards and Dwayne Roloson made 24 saves for his first career playoff shutout as the Oilers eliminated the Sharks in six games. The Oilers had earned a trip to the Western Conference Finals for the first time since 1991–92.

In the Conference Finals, the Oilers faced the sixth-seeded Mighty Ducks of Anaheim, with the series to open at the Arrowhead Pond. In Game 1, Michael Peca extended his playoff goal-scoring streak to three games, and Roloson stopped 31 of 32 shots as the Oilers stunned the Anaheim crowd into silence with a 3–1 victory. Peca would extend his goal streak in Game 2, scoring an empty-netter as the Oilers again iced the Ducks in their home rink, 3–1. Raffi Torres and Marc-Andre Bergeron missed the game, as a bad flu had hit the Oilers' dressing room. The Oilers returned home with a 2–0 series lead, and the Edmonton fans stole the show in Game 3. The crowd was in bedlam by the time the Oilers hit the ice, prompting TV analyst Don Cherry to scream, "This is unbelievable! I don't know how they can lose with this crowd!" Then during the national anthem, after the opening verse, anthem singer Paul Lorieau spontaneously turned the microphone over to the crowd, who finished the song. It was hailed as one of the most touching moments of the entire year in sports. When the game started, the Mighty Ducks attempted to literally fight their way back into the series, as skirmishes ensued after nearly every whistle. By the end of the first period, the Oilers held a slim 1–0 lead, which held until the third period when the Oilers got goals from Peca, Steve Staios and Chris Pronger. By now, the effects of the flu were noticeable on the Oilers, and late in the game the Ducks fought back to make it close, but the Oilers prevailed with a 5–4 win despite being outshot 38–22. In Game 4, the Mighty Ducks started Jean-Sebastien Giguere for the first time in the playoffs and avoided the series sweep by outskating the Oilers, winning the game 6–3 off the strength of two goals by Dustin Penner. The Ducks again outshot the Oilers 45–23 in the tilt. In Game 5 in Anaheim, the Ducks jumped out to an early 1–0 lead, but second period goals by Torres and Ethan Moreau put the Oilers in front. The Oilers would never relinquish their lead as the Ducks pressed furiously for the equalizer. Edmonton would win the Clarence S. Campbell Bowl for the seventh time in team history and claim the series in five games. The win earned the Oilers their first trip to the Stanley Cup Finals since their last Cup win in 1990.

Edmonton would face the Eastern Conference champion Carolina Hurricanes in the Finals. In the opening game, goaltender Dwayne Roloson would go down to injury midway through the third period with the score tied 4–4, and Ty Conklin came in to replace Roloson. Conklin, however, would allow the winning goal as Carolina won the game 5–4. With Jussi Markkanen starting in Game 2, the Hurricanes dominated the Oilers, winning the game 5–0.  Edmonton would rebound in Game 3, playing their first home game in the Stanley Cup Finals since May 22, 1990, with a 2–1 victory, but the Hurricanes would take Game 4 2–1 to take a commanding 3–1 series lead. The Oilers, facing elimination, would take Game 5 to overtime, and eventually win 4–3 score to stay alive in the series. The series then returned to Edmonton for Game 6, and the Oilers shut out Carolina 4–0, setting up the Stanley Cup-deciding Game 7. The Hurricanes, led by goaltender Cam Ward, played a solid defensive game and held the Oilers to just a single goal (scored by Fernando Pisani, his 14th of the playoffs), while the Hurricanes managed to put two behind Jussi Markkanen, as well as score an empty-netter, to seal the game and their first Stanley Cup victory in team history.

Blue Mile

The Blue Mile or the Copper Kilometre is the name given by the local media to the Old Strathcona District's Whyte Avenue during the Edmonton Oilers 2006 Stanley Cup playoff run, since it closely resembled the events which took place on the Red Mile in Calgary two years prior.

Following the Edmonton Oilers upset victory over the Detroit Red Wings in the first round of the 2006 playoffs, several thousand Oiler fans flocked to Whyte Avenue and turned the district into a hockey party strip, as Oiler fans walked the streets cheering, chanting, high-fiving, horn-honking, and flag-waving for their team. Others surfed the crowd in a grocery-shopping cart, and still others climbed trees and traffic lights.

Whyte Avenue in Edmonton gained national attention for its level of violence in May 2006. The arrests at the Blue Mile are estimated at least 350 people through the Oilers Stanley Cup playoff run, including breaching the public peace, assaults, impaired driving, mischief, and alcohol-related offences. This rowdy behaviour led the mayor of Edmonton, Stephen Mandel, to threaten to close down the strip: "I hope this doesn't come down to having to shut down Whyte completely...but this will not be tolerated going into the final series."

Schedule and results

Regular season

|-  style="text-align:center; background:#cfc;"
| 1 || October 5 || Colorado Avalanche || 3–4 || Edmonton Oilers || || Conklin || 16,839 || 1–0–0 || 2 || 
|-  style="text-align:center; background:#cfc;"
| 2 || October 8 || Vancouver Canucks || 3–4 || Edmonton Oilers || SO || Markkanen || 16,839 || 2–0–0 || 4 || 
|-  style="text-align:center; background:#cfc;"
| 3 || October 10 || Edmonton Oilers || 4–2 || Mighty Ducks of Anaheim || || Markkanen || 17,174 || 3–0–0 || 6 || 
|-  style="text-align:center; background:#fbb;"
| 4 || October 11 || Edmonton Oilers || 1–3 || Los Angeles Kings || || Conklin || 16,394 || 3–1–0 || 6 || 
|-  style="text-align:center; background:#fbb;"
| 5 || October 14 || Dallas Stars || 3–2 || Edmonton Oilers || || Markkanen || 16,839 || 3–2–0 || 6 || 
|-  style="text-align:center; background:#fbb;"
| 6 || October 15 || Edmonton Oilers || 0–3 || Calgary Flames || || Markkanen || 19,289 || 3–3–0 || 6 || 
|-  style="text-align:center; background:white;"
| 7 || October 18 || Phoenix Coyotes || 4–3 || Edmonton Oilers || OT || Markkanen || 16,839 || 3–3–1 || 7 || 
|-  style="text-align:center; background:#fbb;"
| 8 || October 20 || Edmonton Oilers || 1–3 || Calgary Flames || || Markkanen || 19,289 || 3–4–1 || 7 || 
|-  style="text-align:center; background:#fbb;"
| 9 || October 21 || Colorado Avalanche || 7–1 || Edmonton Oilers || || Markkanen || 16,839 || 3–5–1 || 7 ||
|-  style="text-align:center; background:#fbb;"
| 10 || October 25 || Edmonton Oilers || 3–5 || Colorado Avalanche || || Markkanen || 18,007 || 3–6–1 || 7 || 
|-  style="text-align:center; background:#cfc;"
| 11 || October 28 || Edmonton Oilers || 5–3 || Dallas Stars || || Markkanen || 16,342 || 4–6–1 || 9 || 
|-  style="text-align:center; background:#cfc;"
| 12 || October 29 || Edmonton Oilers || 5–1 || Nashville Predators || || Markkanen || 14,610 || 5–6–1 || 11 || 
|-

|-  style="text-align:center; background:#cfc;"
| 13 || November 1 || Columbus Blue Jackets || 1–5 || Edmonton Oilers || || Markkanen || 16,839 || 6–6–1 || 13 || 
|-  style="text-align:center; background:#cfc;"
| 14 || November 3 || Edmonton Oilers || 4–3 || Detroit Red Wings || OT || Markkanen || 20,066 || 7–6–1 || 15 || 
|-  style="text-align:center; background:#cfc;"
| 15 || November 4 || Edmonton Oilers || 7–2 || St. Louis Blues || || Markkanen || 13,626 || 8–6–1 || 17 || 
|-  style="text-align:center; background:#fbb;"
| 16 || November 7 || Edmonton Oilers || 0–4 || Dallas Stars || || Markkanen || 15,286 || 8–7–1 || 17 || 
|-  style="text-align:center; background:#fbb;"
| 17 || November 8 || Edmonton Oilers || 2–3 || Nashville Predators || || Markkanen || 11,748 || 8–8–1 || 17 || 
|-  style="text-align:center; background:#cfc;"
| 18 || November 11 || Edmonton Oilers || 3–1 || Columbus Blue Jackets || || Markkanen || 18,136 || 9–8–1 || 19 || 
|-  style="text-align:center; background:#fbb;"
| 19 || November 13 || Edmonton Oilers || 1–3 || Chicago Blackhawks || || Markkanen || 15,299 || 9–9–1 || 19 || 
|-  style="text-align:center; background:#cfc;"
| 20 || November 14 || Edmonton Oilers || 5–2 || Colorado Avalanche || || Morrison || 18,007 || 10–9–1 || 21 || 
|-  style="text-align:center; background:#cfc;"
| 21 || November 17 || Detroit Red Wings || 5–6 || Edmonton Oilers || OT || Markkanen || 16,839 || 11–9–1 || 23 || 
|-  style="text-align:center; background:#fbb;"
| 22 || November 19 || Chicago Blackhawks || 4–3 || Edmonton Oilers || || Markkanen || 16,839 || 11–10–1 || 23 || 
|-  style="text-align:center; background:#cfc;"
| 23 || November 21 || San Jose Sharks || 1–2 || Edmonton Oilers || SO || Morrison || 16,583 || 12–10–1 || 25 || 
|-  style="text-align:center; background:#cfc;"
| 24 || November 23 || Edmonton Oilers || 4–3 || Minnesota Wild || || Morrison || 18,568 || 13–10–1 || 27 || 
|-  style="text-align:center; background:#cfc;"
| 25 || November 25 || Edmonton Oilers || 2–1 || Calgary Flames || SO || Morrison || 19,289 || 14–10–1 || 29 || 
|-  style="text-align:center; background:#fbb;"
| 26 || November 29 || Colorado Avalanche || 3–2 || Edmonton Oilers || || Morrison || 16,839 || 14–11–1 || 29 || 
|-

|-  style="text-align:center; background:#cfc;"
| 27 || December 1 || Vancouver Canucks || 3–5 || Edmonton Oilers || || Markkanen || 16,839 || 15–11–1 || 31 || 
|-  style="text-align:center; background:white;"
| 28 || December 3 || Boston Bruins || 5–4 || Edmonton Oilers || OT || Markkanen || 16,839 || 15–11–2 || 32 || 
|-  style="text-align:center; background:#cfc;"
| 29 || December 8 || Edmonton Oilers || 3–2 || Philadelphia Flyers || || Morrison || 19,411 || 16–11–2 || 34 || 
|-  style="text-align:center; background:white;"
| 30 || December 10 || Edmonton Oilers || 2–3 || New York Islanders || SO || Markkanen || 12,249 || 16–11–3 || 35 || 
|-  style="text-align:center; background:white;"
| 31 || December 13 || Edmonton Oilers || 1–2 || New Jersey Devils || SO || Conklin || 13,507 || 16–11–4 || 36 || 
|-  style="text-align:center; background:#cfc;"
| 32 || December 15 || Montreal Canadiens || 3–5 || Edmonton Oilers || || Conklin || 16,839 || 17–11–4 || 38 || 
|-  style="text-align:center; background:#cfc;"
| 33 || December 17 || Edmonton Oilers || 5–4 || Vancouver Canucks || OT || Markkanen ||| 18,630 || 18–11–4 || 40 || 
|-  style="text-align:center; background:#cfc;"
| 34 || December 19 || Calgary Flames || 4–5 || Edmonton Oilers || || Markkanen || 16,839 || 19–11–4 || 42 || 
|-  style="text-align:center; background:#cfc;"
| 35 || December 21 || Edmonton Oilers || 7–6 || Vancouver Canucks || || Conklin || 18,630 || 20–11–4 || 44 || 
|-  style="text-align:center; background:#cfc;"
| 36 || December 23 || Los Angeles Kings || 3–5 || Edmonton Oilers || || Conklin || 16,839 || 21–11–4 || 46 || 
|-  style="text-align:center; background:#fbb;"
| 37 || December 26 || Minnesota Wild || 4–1 || Edmonton Oilers || || Conklin || 16,839 || 21–12–4 || 46 || 
|-  style="text-align:center; background:#fbb;"
| 38 || December 28 || Minnesota Wild || 4–2 || Edmonton Oilers || || Conklin || 16,839 || 21–13–4 || 46 || 
|-  style="text-align:center; background:#cfc;"
| 39 || December 30 || Nashville Predators || 2–4 || Edmonton Oilers || || Markkanen || 16,839 || 22–13–4 || 48 || 
|-  style="text-align:center; background:#fbb;"
| 40 || December 31 || Edmonton Oilers || 5–6 || Calgary Flames || || Markkanen || 19,289 || 22–14–4 || 48 || 
|-

|-  style="text-align:center; background:#cfc;"
| 41 || January 3 || Chicago Blackhawks || 0–5 || Edmonton Oilers || || Conklin || 16,839 || 23–14–4 || 50 || 
|-  style="text-align:center; background:#fbb;"
| 42 || January 7 || Toronto Maple Leafs || 3–2 || Edmonton Oilers || || Conklin || 16,839 || 23–15–4 || 50 || 
|-  style="text-align:center; background:#cfc;"
| 43 || January 10 || Edmonton Oilers || 3–1 || Pittsburgh Penguins || || Markkanen || 14,905 || 24–15–4 || 52 || 
|-  style="text-align:center; background:white;"
| 44 || January 12 || Edmonton Oilers || 4–5 || New York Rangers || OT || Markkanen || 18,200 || 24–15–5 || 53 || 
|-  style="text-align:center; background:#fbb;"
| 45 || January 14 || Ottawa Senators || 5–3 || Edmonton Oilers || || Conklin || 16,839 || 24–16–5 || 53 || 
|-  style="text-align:center; background:#fbb;"
| 46 || January 16 || Buffalo Sabres || 3–1 || Edmonton Oilers || || Markkanen || 16,839 || 24–17–5 || 53 || 
|-  style="text-align:center; background:#cfc;"
| 47 || January 19 || Edmonton Oilers || 3–2 || San Jose Sharks || SO || Morrison || 15,683 || 25–17–5 || 55 || 
|-  style="text-align:center; background:white;"
| 48 || January 21 || Edmonton Oilers || 3–4 || Phoenix Coyotes || OT || Markkanen || 17,799 || 25–17–6 || 56 || 
|-  style="text-align:center; background:#fbb;"
| 49 || January 23 || Calgary Flames || 3–1 || Edmonton Oilers || || Morrison || 16,839 || 25–18–6 || 56 || 
|-  style="text-align:center; background:#cfc;"
| 50 || January 25 || Edmonton Oilers || 6–3 || Mighty Ducks of Anaheim || || Markkanen || 14,456 || 26–18–6 || 58 || 
|-  style="text-align:center; background:#cfc;"
| 51 || January 26 || Edmonton Oilers || 5–3 || Los Angeles Kings || || Morrison || 18,118 || 27–18–6 || 60 || 
|-  style="text-align:center; background:#cfc;"
| 52 || January 29 || Edmonton Oilers || 4–3 || Phoenix Coyotes || SO || Morrison || 16,153 || 28–18–6 || 62 || 
|-

|-  style="text-align:center; background:white;"
| 53 || February 2 || Columbus Blue Jackets || 2–1 || Edmonton Oilers || SO || Markkanen || 16,839 || 28–18–7 || 63 || 
|-  style="text-align:center; background:#cfc;"
| 54 || February 4 || Vancouver Canucks || 1–3 || Edmonton Oilers || || Morrison || 16,839 || 29–18–7 || 65 || 
|-  style="text-align:center; background:#cfc;"
| 55 || February 6 || Mighty Ducks of Anaheim || 5–6 || Edmonton Oilers || SO || Morrison || 16,839 || 30–18–7 || 67 || 
|-  style="text-align:center; background:#fbb;"
| 56 || February 7 || Edmonton Oilers || 2–5 || Colorado Avalanche || || Morrison || 18,007 || 30–19–7 || 67 || 
|-  style="text-align:center; background:#fbb;"
| 57 || February 10 || Minnesota Wild || 6–3 || Edmonton Oilers || || Morrison || 16,839 || 30–20–7 || 67 || 
|-  style="text-align:center; background:white;"
| 58 || February 12 || St. Louis Blues || 5–4 || Edmonton Oilers || SO || Morrison || 16,839 || 30–20–8 || 68 || 
|-

|-  style="text-align:center; background:#fbb;"
| 59 || March 1 || St. Louis Blues || 4–2 || Edmonton Oilers || || Markkanen || 16,839 || 30–21–8 || 68 || 
|-  style="text-align:center; background:#cfc;"
| 60 || March 3 || San Jose Sharks || 2–3 || Edmonton Oilers || || Conklin || 16,839 || 31–21–8 || 70 || 
|-  style="text-align:center; background:#cfc;"
| 61 || March 5 || Nashville Predators || 2–3 || Edmonton Oilers || OT || Conklin || 16,839 || 32–21–8 || 72 || 
|-  style="text-align:center; background:white;"
| 62 || March 7 || Dallas Stars || 4–3 || Edmonton Oilers || SO || Morrison || 16,839 || 32–21–9 || 73 || 
|-  style="text-align:center; background:#fbb;"
| 63 || March 9 || Edmonton Oilers || 2–5 || San Jose Sharks || || Roloson || 15,878 || 32–22–9 || 73 || 
|-  style="text-align:center; background:white;"
| 64 || March 11 || Edmonton Oilers || 3–4 || Columbus Blue Jackets || OT || Roloson || 18,136 || 32–22–10 || 74 || 
|-  style="text-align:center; background:#fbb;"
| 65 || March 12 || Edmonton Oilers || 3–4 || Minnesota Wild || || Roloson || 18,568 || 32–23–10 || 74 || 
|-  style="text-align:center; background:#cfc;"
| 66 || March 14 || Edmonton Oilers || 2–1 || Minnesota Wild || || Roloson || 18,568 || 33–23–10 || 76 || 
|-  style="text-align:center; background:#cfc;"
| 67 || March 16 || Calgary Flames || 2–3 || Edmonton Oilers || OT || Roloson || 16,839 || 34–23–10 || 78 || 
|-  style="text-align:center; background:white;"
| 68 || March 18 || Detroit Red Wings || 4–3 || Edmonton Oilers || SO || Roloson || 16,839 || 34–23–11 || 79 || 
|-  style="text-align:center; background:#fbb;"
| 69 || March 21 || Vancouver Canucks || 4–1 || Edmonton Oilers || || Roloson || 16,839 || 34–24–11 || 79 || 
|-  style="text-align:center; background:white;"
| 70 || March 23 || Edmonton Oilers || 3–4 || Vancouver Canucks || SO || Roloson || 18,630 || 34–24–12 || 80 || 
|-  style="text-align:center; background:#cfc;"
| 71 || March 25 || Edmonton Oilers || 3–2 || Vancouver Canucks || || Roloson || 18,630 || 35–24–12 || 82 || 
|-  style="text-align:center; background:#cfc;"
| 72 || March 26 || Edmonton Oilers || 4–3 || Colorado Avalanche || SO || Roloson || 18,007 || 36–24–12 || 84 || 
|-  style="text-align:center; background:#fbb;"
| 73 || March 28 || Minnesota Wild || 3–2 || Edmonton Oilers || || Roloson || 16,839 || 36–25–12 || 84 || 
|-  style="text-align:center; background:#cfc;"
| 74 || March 30 || Los Angeles Kings || 0–4 || Edmonton Oilers || || Roloson || 16,839 || 37–25–12 || 86 || 
|-

|-  style="text-align:center; background:#fbb;"
| 75 || April 1 || Calgary Flames || 4–1 || Edmonton Oilers || || Roloson || 16,839 || 37–26–12 || 86 || 
|-  style="text-align:center; background:#cfc;"
| 76 || April 3 || Phoenix Coyotes || 1–7 || Edmonton Oilers || || Roloson || 16,839 || 38–26–12 || 88 || 
|-  style="text-align:center; background:white;"
| 77 || April 6 || Edmonton Oilers || 1–2 || Minnesota Wild || SO || Roloson || 18,568 || 38–26–13 || 89 || 
|-  style="text-align:center; background:#cfc;"
| 78 || April 7 || Edmonton Oilers || 4–3 || Chicago Blackhawks || OT || Roloson || 14,280 || 39–26–13 || 91 || 
|-  style="text-align:center; background:#fbb;"
| 79 || April 9 || Edmonton Oilers || 1–2 || St. Louis Blues || || Roloson || 19,090 || 39–27–13 || 91 || 
|-  style="text-align:center; background:#fbb;"
| 80 || April 11 || Edmonton Oilers || 0–2 || Detroit Red Wings || || Roloson || 20,066 || 39–28–13 || 91 || 
|-  style="text-align:center; background:#cfc;"
| 81 || April 13 || Mighty Ducks of Anaheim || 1–2 || Edmonton Oilers || || Roloson || 16,839 || 40–28–13 || 93 || 
|-  style="text-align:center; background:#cfc;"
| 82 || April 17 || Colorado Avalanche || 2–4 || Edmonton Oilers || || Conklin || 16,839 || 41–28–13 || 95 || 
|-

|-
| Legend:

Playoffs

|-  style="text-align:center; background:#fbb;"
| 1 || April 21 || Edmonton Oilers || 2–3 || Detroit Red Wings || 2OT || Roloson || 20,066 || 0–1 || 
|-  style="text-align:center; background:#cfc;"
| 2 || April 23 || Edmonton Oilers || 4–2 || Detroit Red Wings || || Roloson || 20,066 || 1–1 || 
|-  style="text-align:center; background:#cfc;"
| 3 || April 25 || Detroit Red Wings || 3–4 || Edmonton Oilers || 2OT || Roloson || 16,839 || 2–1 || 
|-  style="text-align:center; background:#fbb;"
| 4 || April 27 || Detroit Red Wings || 4–2 || Edmonton Oilers || || Roloson || 16,839 || 2–2 || 
|-  style="text-align:center; background:#cfc;"
| 5 || April 29 || Edmonton Oilers || 3–2 || Detroit Red Wings || || Roloson || 20,066 || 3–2 || 
|-  style="text-align:center; background:#cfc;"
| 6 || May 1 || Detroit Red Wings || 3–4 || Edmonton Oilers || || Roloson || 16,839 || 4–2 || 
|-

|-  style="text-align:center; background:#fbb;"
| 1 || May 7 || Edmonton Oilers || 1–2 || San Jose Sharks || || Roloson || 17,496 || 0–1 || 
|-  style="text-align:center; background:#fbb;"
| 2 || May 8 || Edmonton Oilers || 1–2 || San Jose Sharks || || Roloson || 17,496 || 0–2 || 
|-  style="text-align:center; background:#cfc;"
| 3 || May 10 || San Jose Sharks || 2–3 || Edmonton Oilers || 3OT || Roloson || 16,839 || 1–2 || 
|-  style="text-align:center; background:#cfc;"
| 4 || May 12 || San Jose Sharks || 3–6 || Edmonton Oilers || || Roloson || 16,839 || 2–2 || 
|-  style="text-align:center; background:#cfc;"
| 5 || May 14 || Edmonton Oilers || 6–3 || San Jose Sharks || || Roloson || 17,496 || 3–2 || 
|-  style="text-align:center; background:#cfc;"
| 6 || May 17 || San Jose Sharks || 0–2 || Edmonton Oilers || || Roloson || 16,839 || 4–2 || 
|-

|-  style="text-align:center; background:#cfc;"
| 1 || May 19 || Edmonton Oilers || 3–1 || Mighty Ducks of Anaheim || || Roloson || 17,174 || 1–0 || 
|-  style="text-align:center; background:#cfc;"
| 2 || May 21 || Edmonton Oilers || 3–1 || Mighty Ducks of Anaheim || || Roloson || 17,264 || 2–0 || 
|-  style="text-align:center; background:#cfc;"
| 3 || May 23 || Mighty Ducks of Anaheim || 4–5 || Edmonton Oilers || || Roloson || 16,839 || 3–0 || 
|-  style="text-align:center; background:#fbb;"
| 4 || May 25 || Mighty Ducks of Anaheim || 6–3 || Edmonton Oilers || || Roloson || 16,839 || 3–1 || 
|-  style="text-align:center; background:#cfc;"
| 5 || May 27 || Edmonton Oilers || 2–1 || Mighty Ducks of Anaheim || || Roloson || 17,174 || 4–1 || 
|-

|-  style="text-align:center; background:#fbb;"
| 1 || June 5 || Edmonton Oilers || 4–5 || Carolina Hurricanes || || Conklin || 18,797 || 0–1 || 
|-  style="text-align:center; background:#fbb;"
| 2 || June 7 || Edmonton Oilers || 0–5 || Carolina Hurricanes || || Markkanen || 18,928 || 0–2 || 
|-  style="text-align:center; background:#cfc;"
| 3 || June 10 || Carolina Hurricanes || 1–2 || Edmonton Oilers || || Markkanen || 16,839 || 1–2 || 
|-  style="text-align:center; background:#fbb;"
| 4 || June 12 || Carolina Hurricanes || 2–1 || Edmonton Oilers || || Markkanen || 16,839 || 1–3 || 
|-  style="text-align:center; background:#cfc;"
| 5 || June 14 || Edmonton Oilers || 4–3 || Carolina Hurricanes || OT || Markkanen || 18,974 || 2–3 || 
|-  style="text-align:center; background:#cfc;"
| 6 || June 17 || Carolina Hurricanes || 0–4 || Edmonton Oilers || || Markkanen || 16,839 || 3–3 || 
|-  style="text-align:center; background:#fbb;"
| 7 || June 19 || Edmonton Oilers || 1–3 || Carolina Hurricanes || || Markkanen || 18,978 || 3–4 || 
|-

|-
| Legend:

Player statistics

Scoring
 Position abbreviations: C = Centre; D = Defence; G = Goaltender; LW = Left Wing; RW = Right Wing
  = Joined team via a transaction (e.g., trade, waivers, signing) during the season. Stats reflect time with the Oilers only.
  = Left team via a transaction (e.g., trade, waivers, release) during the season. Stats reflect time with the Oilers only.

Goaltending
  = Joined team via a transaction (e.g., trade, waivers, signing) during the season. Stats reflect time with the Oilers only.
  = Left team via a transaction (e.g., trade, waivers, release) during the season. Stats reflect time with the Oilers only.

Awards and records

Awards

Milestones

Transactions
The Oilers were involved in the following transactions from February 17, 2005, the day after the 2004–05 NHL season was officially cancelled, through June 19, 2006, the day of the deciding game of the 2006 Stanley Cup Finals.

Trades

Players acquired

Players lost

Signings

Draft picks
Edmonton's draft picks at the 2005 NHL Entry Draft

Farm teams
Hamilton Bulldogs (AHL)

See also
 2005–06 NHL season

Notes

References

 National Hockey League Guide & Record Book 2007

Edmonton Oilers season, 2005-06
Edmon
Edmonton Oilers seasons
Western Conference (NHL) championship seasons